Eupyrgota is a genus of flies in the family Pyrgotidae. A number of its species were originally from Apyrgota and Taeniomastix, which in 2014 were made synonyms of Eupyrgota by V. Korneyev.

Species 

Apyrgota marshalli Hendel, 1914 was transferred to Afropyrgota. Apyrgota breviventris Shi, 1996, Apyrgota fura Shi, 1996, Apyrgota jiangleensis Shi, 1994 and Apyrgota longa Shi, 1996 were transferred to Tylotrypes.

References 

Pyrgotidae
Diptera of Africa
Brachycera genera
Taxa named by Daniel William Coquillett